is a former Japanese professional baseball player. He is currently with the Tokyo Yakult Swallows in Japan's Nippon Professional Baseball.  Despite having one of the best fastballs and sliders of anyone in the league, Arakaki has battled control problems and injuries throughout his career.  In 2007, Arakaki set the NPB record for most wild pitches in a season with 21, breaking Kazuhisa Ishii's record.

Arakaki was first seen at the 1998 Koshien summer tournament, and caught the eyes of many scouts with his fastball and sharp break on his slider.  Despite his team not going far in the tournament, he was scouted by the Orix BlueWave and offered a contract.  However, Arakaki turned it down stating that he did not intend to play for Orix.  Incidentally, Katsutoshi Miwata who scouted Arakaki subsequently jumped to his death from an apartment building.

In both 2008 and 2009, Arakaki had been in and out of the lineup due to persistent shoulder problems.  From the end of '07 to late '08, the righty did not win a start, a stretch that spanned from September 17, 2007, to August 28, 2008.  In the 2008 campaign, Arakaki finished with a 4-6 record and a 4.18 ERA.  The 2009 season was far less kind, as the embattled righty went 0-2 with a 7.91 ERA whilst battling shoulder injuries.  He did not pitch at the Major League level in 2010 and 2011 due to injury.  He finally cracked the Opening Day roster in 2012 for his first action in nearly three years.

Pitching style
When he was drafted, Arakaki was considered one of the best pure power pitchers in the league, with a fastball that could  consistently sit in 90-93 mph, and went as high as 155 km/h (96 mph) with an excellent slider that had late downward break.  However, control has always been Arakaki's Achilles' heel, as he set the NPB record for wild pitches in 2007, a record that had been previously held by Kazuhisa Ishii, who was also a power pitcher with great breaking balls, but was also well known for his control problems.

Arakaki's later career has been plagued by recurrent shoulder and elbow problems.  He had elbow surgery performed on him in the 2008 offseason, and had shoulder surgery in December 2009.  Because of his rehab, he did not pitch at the ichi-gun level until 2012.

External links

1980 births
Fukuoka Daiei Hawks players
Fukuoka SoftBank Hawks players
Japanese baseball players
Living people
Nippon Professional Baseball pitchers
People from Naha
Tokyo Yakult Swallows players